Gerrit Roelof Diederik van Doesburgh (26 October 1900 – 24 April 1966) was a Dutch chess player, Dutch Chess Championship silver medalist (1936).

Biography
In the 1930s Gerrit van Doesburgh was one of the leading Dutch chess players. In 1936, in Rotterdam he ranked 2nd in Dutch Chess Championship behind winner Salo Landau.

Gerrit van Doesburgh played for Netherlands in the Chess Olympiad:
 In 1931, at reserve board in the 4th Chess Olympiad in Prague (+0, =0, -5).

Gerrit van Doesburgh played for Netherlands in the unofficial Chess Olympiad:
 In 1936, at first board in the 3rd unofficial Chess Olympiad in Munich (+1, =4, -13).

References

External links

Gerrit van Doesburgh chess games at 365chess.com

1900 births
1966 deaths
Dutch chess players
Chess Olympiad competitors
20th-century chess players